Minnesota State Highway 106 (MN 106) is a  highway in west-central Minnesota, which runs from its intersection with State Highway 29 in Deer Creek and continues north to its northern terminus at its intersection with U.S. Highway 10 near New York Mills.

Highway 106 passes through the communities of Deer Creek, Deer Creek Township, and Newton Township.

Route description
State Highway 106 serves as a north–south route between Deer Creek and New York Mills in west-central Minnesota.

The route is located in Otter Tail County.

Highway 106 crosses the Leaf River in Deer Creek Township.

The route is legally defined as Route 184 in the Minnesota Statutes. It is not marked with this number.

History
State Highway 106 was authorized in 1933.

The route was paved by 1953.

Major intersections

References

106
Transportation in Otter Tail County, Minnesota